Artur Gariyevich Chyorny (born 11 February 2000) is a Russian football player. He plays as a centre-back or right-back for FC Khimki.

Club career
He made his debut in the Russian Premier League for FC Lokomotiv Moscow on 22 July 2020 in a game against FC Ural Yekaterinburg, replacing Aleksei Miranchuk in added time.

On 14 July 2022, Chyorny signed a three-year contract with FC Khimki.

Career statistics

References

External links
 
 

2000 births
Sportspeople from Vladikavkaz
Living people
Russian footballers
Association football defenders
FC Lokomotiv Moscow players
FC Khimki players
Russian Second League players
Russian Premier League players